The Moroccan Women's Championship is the top flight of women's association football in Morocco. The competition is run by the Royal Moroccan Football Federation. At the top of the Moroccan football league system, it is the country's primary women's football competition. It operates on a system of promotion and relegation with the W-Championship D2.

The current champions are AS FAR who won the title in 2021–22 season.

History
The first Moroccan women's championship was contested in 2001-02 season.

Champions
The list of champions and runners-up:

Most successful clubs

By city

See also 
 Moroccan Women Throne Cup

References

External links 
 Football Féminin - FRMF official website

 

 
Women's association football leagues in Africa
Women's football competitions in Morocco
Women
2001 establishments in Morocco
Sports leagues established in 2001